Phyllosticta concentrica is a fungal plant pathogen.

See also
List of foliage plant diseases (Araliaceae)

References

External links
USDA ARS Fungal Database

Fungal plant pathogens and diseases
concentrica
Fungi described in 1876